McCreary is a surname. It is derived from the Irish and Scottish Gaelic surnames Mac Ruidhrí and Mac Ruaidhrí.

People with the surname
Aaron McCreary, American college baseball coach
Bear McCreary (born 1979), American composer and musician
Bill McCreary (disambiguation), a number of people involved in ice hockey
Conn McCreary (1921–1979), American Hall of Fame jockey and trainer in Thoroughbred horse racing
Ethel McCreary, Canadian All-American Girls Professional Baseball League player
George Deardorff McCreary (1846–1915), U.S. Representative from Pennsylvania
James B. McCreary (1838–1918), Governor of Kentucky, U.S. Representative and Senator
Jay McCreary (1918–1995), American basketball player and coach
Foley (musician), stage name of Joseph McCreary, Jr.
John McCreary (1761–1833), U.S. Representative from South Carolina
Keith McCreary (1940–2003), National Hockey League player
Loaird McCreary (born 1953), American football player
Lori McCreary, American film producer and computer scientist
Roger McCreary (born 2000), American football player
William McCreary (1855–1904), Canadian politician, mayor of Winnipeg and member of the House of Commons

Citations

References

Anglicised Irish-language surnames
Anglicised Scottish Gaelic-language surnames
Patronymic surnames